This is a list of coats of arms and other emblems of Gibraltar, a British Overseas Territory located on the southern end of the Iberian Peninsula at the entrance of the Mediterranean.

Gibraltar

Gibraltar Government

Versions

Historical

Variants

See also

Armorial of the United Kingdom and dependencies
List of flags of Gibraltar

Coat of arms, list